2020 World Ice Hockey Championships may refer to:

 2020 Men's World Ice Hockey Championships
 2020 IIHF World Championship
 2020 World Junior Ice Hockey Championships
 2020 IIHF World U18 Championships